This is a summary of the highest scoring games and biggest winning margins in the A-League since its establishment in the 2005–06 season. The record for the biggest win is Adelaide United's 8–1 victory against North Queensland Fury on 21 January 2011.

Only two games have had ten goals scored in the fourteen seasons of the A-League, both 8–2 results involving Central Coast Mariners. Seven games have had nine goals scored.

Highest scoring games

Biggest winning margin

References
General

Specific

A-League Men records and statistics
A-League Men lists